Gordon Jeffery (born 20 May 1936) is an Australian sprint canoeist who competed from the mid-1960s to the early 1970s. Competing in three Summer Olympics, he earned his best finish of eighth  in the K-2 1000 m event at Tokyo in 1964.

References

1936 births
Australian male canoeists
Canoeists at the 1964 Summer Olympics
Canoeists at the 1968 Summer Olympics
Canoeists at the 1972 Summer Olympics
Living people
Olympic canoeists of Australia
20th-century Australian people